is a major railway station in Kagoshima, Japan, operated by the Kyushu Railway Company (JR Kyushu). It is the main railway terminal serving Kagoshima, the southern terminus of the Kyushu Shinkansen, and is located on the Kagoshima Main Line and Ibusuki-Makurazaki Line. It is also the southernmost high-speed Shinkansen railway terminal in Japan.

Before the Kyushu Shinkansen opened in 2004, the station was called .

In fiscal year 2016, the station was used by an average of 19,842 passengers daily (boarding passengers only), and it ranked third among the busiest JR Kyushu stations.

History 
On December 17, 1915, the adjacent  opened.

On March 13, 2004, Nishi-Kagoshima Station was renamed , and Kyushu Shinkansen services began between Shin-Yatsushiro and Kagoshima-Chūō.

Lines
Kagoshima-Chūō Station is served by the following JR Kyushu lines:
Kyushu Shinkansen
Kagoshima Main Line
Ibusuki-Makurazaki Line
The Kyushu Shinkansen tracks and platforms are perpendicular to the Kagoshima Main and Ibusuki-Makurazaki tracks and platforms.

Platforms

Trains

Limited Express trains 
 Kirishima - Nippō Main Line
 Ibusuki no Tamatebako - Ibusuki Makurazaki Line

Liner and Rapid trains 
 Nanohana - Ibusuki Makurazaki Line
 Ocean Liner Satsuma - Kagoshima Main Line

Adjacent stations

Ekiben

Tonkatsu bento, a bento with tonkatsu available as ekiben, is a local specialty consisting of Kagoshima pork ribs simmered in shōchū, miso, and black sugar for over five hours.

Surrounding areas 
 Kagoshima-Chūō Ekimae tram stop
 Amu Plaza Kagoshima and Amuran Ferris wheel
 Kagoshima Central Post Office
 Museum of the Meiji Restoration
 
 Kagoshima Prefectural Konan High School
 Kagoshima Prefectural Tsurumaru High School

See also

 List of railway stations in Japan

References

External links

 JR Kyushu timetable for Kagoshima-Chūō Station 

Railway stations in Japan opened in 1913
Railway stations in Kagoshima Prefecture
Buildings and structures in Kagoshima